Frances Susan Itani, née Hill (born August 25, 1942) is a Canadian fiction writer, poet and essayist. She is a Member of the Order of Canada.

Biography
Itani was born in Belleville, Ontario, and grew up in Quebec. She studied nursing in Montreal and North Carolina, a profession which she taught and practised for eight years. However, after enrolling in a writing class taught by W. O. Mitchell, she decided to change careers.

She married Tetsuo (Ted) Itani, a retired Canadian Forces officer and humanitarian, in 1967. They reside in Ottawa, Ontario.Ted recently passed away due to a traumatic accident out while he was running. Ted will be missed greatly.

Itani has published eighteen books, ranging from fiction and poetry to a children's book. Her 2003 novel Deafening was shortlisted for the International IMPAC Dublin Award, and won the Commonwealth Writers Prize, Caribbean and Canada region, and has been published in 16 countries.

Awards
Deafening was shortlisted for the International IMPAC Dublin Award, and won the Commonwealth Writers Prize, Caribbean and Canada region.

Itani was the 2021 recipient of the Writers' Trust of Canada's annual Matt Cohen Award.

Bibliography

Children's
Linger By the Sea (1979) (illustrated by Molly Bobak)
Best Friend Trouble (2014)  (illustrated by Genevieve Despres)

Short stories
Pack Ice (1989)
Truth or Lies (1989)
Man Without Face (1994)
Poached Egg on Toast (2004)

Poetry
A Season of Mourning
No Other Lodgings (1978)
Rentee Bay:  poems from the Bay of Quinte, 1785-89 (1983)

Novels
Leaning, Leaning Over Water (1998)
Deafening (2003)
Remembering the Bones (2007)
Missing (2011)
Requiem (2011)
Tell (2014) (shortlisted for the Scotiabank Giller Prize)
That's My Baby (2017)
The Company We Keep (2020)

References

External links 
 Biography at Canada Reads
 Archives of Frances Itani (Frances Itani fonds (R11753) are held at National Archives of Canada

1942 births
20th-century Canadian novelists
21st-century Canadian novelists
20th-century Canadian poets
21st-century Canadian poets
Canadian nurses
Canadian women nurses
Canadian women novelists
Canadian women poets
Living people
Writers from Belleville, Ontario
Canadian women short story writers
Writers from Ottawa
20th-century Canadian women writers
21st-century Canadian women writers
20th-century Canadian short story writers
21st-century Canadian short story writers